The AI Challenge was an international artificial intelligence programming contest started by the University of Waterloo Computer Science Club.

Initially the contest was for University of Waterloo students only. In 2010, the contest gained sponsorship from Google and allowed it to extend to international students and the general public.

Description
Each participant wrote a self-contained computer program to play a game versus an opponent, and then uploaded the source code to a server.  The contest engine used the Trueskill ranking algorithm for matchmaking and to generate the rankings.

After a match, spectators could watch the match using a browser.

The contest was open source. Contestants were welcomed to improve the contest back-end.

Winners

See also 

 List of computer science awards

References

External links
 AI Challenge
 Past Tron (Winter 2010) Challenge
 University of Waterloo Computer Science Club

Programming contests
Computer science competitions